Overdosed America: The Broken Promise of American Medicine is a book about unnecessary healthcare.

Reviews
A reviewer for BMJ called the book "the latest in a series of searing indictments of a medical profession apparently duped by the false promise of technology, and too often compromised by cold hard cash from the companies selling the drugs and devices".

The reviewer for The Washington Post stated that the strength of the book was in its ability to discuss articles from scientific journals.

Another reviewer said that in the book the author "presents a strong indictment of the evidence that dictates medical practice, a challenge that is credible only because Abramson backs up his statements with detailed analyses of the prevailing evidence".

References

External links
interview with author about book in Managed Care
interview with author about book in Reporting on Health

2004 non-fiction books
Books about health care
Unnecessary health care
Harper & Brothers books